Egon Zakrajšek (July 7, 1941 – September 2002) was a Slovene mathematician and computer scientist.

Zakrajšek was born in Ljubljana, SFR Yugoslavia (today Slovenia). He became an orphan even before he started school. He went to elementary school and gymnasium in Jesenice. He was a good student and he soon showed his talents and abilities. He graduated from technical mathematics at the Department of mathematics and physics of the then Faculty for natural sciences and technology (FNT) of the University of Ljubljana. He received his Master's degree from the University of Zagreb for his work Numerična realizacija Ritzovega procesa (Numerical realization of the Ritz process) and his doctorate in 1978 in Ljubljana with his dissertation O invariantni vložitvi pri reševanju diferencialnih enačb (About the invariable embedding in solving of differential equations).

Professor Zakrajšek was one of the pioneers of computer science in Slovenia. He became an expert on the first computers of the University of Ljubljana, the Zuse Z-23 and its successor the IBM 1130. He later participated in the development of programming languages, tools and operating systems. At the same time he wrote textbooks and manuals for them: for Z-23 assembly, Algol, Fortran, Algol 68, Pascal, for domestic structran. In 1982 he set off for the United States and he became the manager of programming equipment at the Cromemco company. In 1994 he returned to homeland, where he was again a professor. With his advocacy for the C language and open operating systems, that is, Unix and Linux, he helped to modernize the lessons of computer science. He additionally became an expert for TeX, LaTeX and MATLAB.

Beside his computer science skills he was also an excellent mathematician with a broad profile. He taught and solved problems from many fields: the usage of mathematics in natural and social sciences, statistics, mechanics, classical applied mathematics, discrete mathematics, graph and network theory, linear programming, operational researches, numerical analysis.

References 

 Marija Vencelj, Umrl je prof. dr. Egon Zakrajšek (Professor Dr. Egon Zakrajšek has died), (Obzornik mat, fiz. 49 (2002) 6, pp 184 – 186).

1941 births
2002 deaths
Scientists from Ljubljana
Slovenian computer scientists
20th-century Slovenian mathematicians
Faculty of Science, University of Zagreb alumni
University of Ljubljana alumni
University of Zagreb alumni
Academic staff of the University of Ljubljana